The Cumbria Men's League is a rugby league competition founded in 2013 by the top clubs from the Cumberland League and some clubs in the Barrow-in-Furness area that switched from the North West Men's League.  It started as a joint venture between the Rugby Football League and the British Amateur Rugby League Association It sits directly below the National Conference League in the pyramid and above the Cumberland League and Barrow & District League.

History
Whilst a Cumbria League briefly existed in the early days of the British Amateur Rugby League Association, for most of rugby league's history clubs from Cumberland and Barrow have had separate competitions, with the Barrow-based clubs having increasingly played in the North West Counties and more recently the North West Men's League, leaving the Barrow & District League as primarily a reserve competition.

Whilst the initial competition featured just eight clubs of which only two were from Barrow, the league has gradually expanded up to an 11 team league as more clubs have switched across from the North West Men's League and stepped up from the Cumberland League

Teams for 2016 season
Barrow Island
Distington
Ellenborough Rangers
Glasson Rangers
Hensingham
Maryport
Roose Pioneers
Seaton Rangers
Ulverston
Walney Central
Wath Brow Hornets A

Competing teams per season
2015: Barrow Island, Distington, Glasson Rangers, Maryport, Roose Pioneers, Seaton Rangers, Ulverston, Walney Central, Wath Brow Hornets A
2014: Barrow Island, Cockermouth Titans, Distington, Glasson Rangers, Maryport, Roose Pioneers, Seaton Rangers, Walney Central, Wath Brow Hornets A (Cockermouth Titans failed to complete the season)
2013: Barrow Island, Cockermouth Titans, Distington, Glasson Rangers, Maryport, Seaton Rangers, Walney Central, Wath Brow Hornets A (Seaton Rangers failed to complete the season)

Past winners
2013: Walney Central
2014: Walney Central
2015: Walney Central
2016: Distington ARLFC
2017: Hensingham ARLFC

See also
Barrow & District League
British rugby league system
Cumberland League

References

Rugby league in Cumbria